Moldaeroservice is a major airline and airports' operator of the Republic of Moldova headquartered in Bălți on the historic location of the Bălți City Airport at strada Aerodromului 12, next to the "Autogara" district. The company is legally organised as a state-owned enterprise — .

Background 
Moldaeroservice founded in Bălți, became the most important aviation service provider in Moldova and one of the largest aviation enterprises in Moldova with about 500 employees. Founded in 1966, the company was reformed under its current name in 1996. Moldaeroservice provides airline services airline and airports' operator services, using its own aircraft and helicopters that perform flights in the airspace of Moldova and abroad. Moldaeroservice services also include air traffic services, operator of two airports in Bălți (Bălți City Airport and Bălți International Airport) and airline with subdivisions at Chișinău International Airport today and earlier at aerodromes of Bender and Soroca.

Moldaeroservice operates today out of its main bases at Bălți City Airport and Bălți International Airport and out of Chișinău International Airport, with previous operated hubs at aerodromes of Bender and Soroca.

During more than 45 years since its foundation, Moldaeroservice has become one of the most experienced providers of aviation services with Mi-2 and An-2 helicopters not only in Moldova, but also abroad (Egypt, Algeria, Iraq, Romania, Bulgaria, Turkey, Singapore and South Korea). Secondary offices in (current) Chisinau and (historical) Bender.

The current founding owner of Moldaeroservice is the Public Property Agency, which exercises its management rights through the administration board and the administrator.

History
In 1958, the Civil Aviation Squadron of Bălți was formed in addition to the Moldaivan Special Aviation Group of the Civil Air Fleet

Since 27 July 1964 the Civil Aviation Squadron of Bălți has been subordinated to the Moldovan Special Aviation Group of Civil Aviation.

Between July 1965 and 1966 the Combined Civil Aviation Squadron of Bălți was subordinated to the Combined Aviation Unit of Chișinău.

From 1966 to September 1969 the Bălți Flight Unit No. 281 was subordinated to the Civil Aviation Directorate of the Moldavian Soviet Socialist Republic.

Between September 1969 and February 1978, the Combined Aviation Unit of Bălți was subordinated to the Civil Aviation Directorate of the Moldavian Soviet Socialist Republic.

From February 1978 until 1 January 1983 the Combined Aviation Unit of Bălți was subordinated to the Republican Production Unit of the Moldovan Civil Aviation.

Since 1 January 1983, the Combined Aviation Unit of Bălți has been subordinated to the Directorate of Civil Aviation of the Moldavian Soviet Socialist Republic.

The state enterprise "Moldaeroservice", was founded in 1966 as the Bălți Flight Unit No. 281 of the Combined Aviation Unit of Bălți by order of the Minister of Civil Aviation of the USSR, based on the civil aviation squadron of Yakovelev Yak-12 and Antonov An-2 aircraft. Together with the Bălţi-City Airport Services, the Bălți Aviation Unit No. 281 formed the Combined Aviation Unit of Bălți.

The commander of Bălți Flight Unit No. 281 was appointed Nicolae Zavadschii, the head of the airport - Petru Ovcinicov, the head of the airport technical service base - Victor Șerstiuc and the head of the Combined Aviation Unit of Bălți - Vitalie Bezdenejnîh. Among the commanders of the Combined Aviation Unit of Bălți were: Alexei Lyciman, Yevgeny Ilyakov, Anatolii Bajucov, Alexei Alexeev, Vasilii Burma, Ivan Tomac, Vladimir Rishkov, Valery Cenin. Among the heads of the airport's technical services base were Grigore Rotari, Boris Cabac, Victor Gherta. The air navigation service was headed by Dmitrie Covalciuc, and the passenger service by Maria Ribacova, Alexandr Ojegov, Leonid Solovyov. The airport and ground service was headed by Petru Lobanov, Rașid Biriucov, Dmitrie Gubarev, Vasile Barabaș. Throughout its development, the company went through many stages of restructuring and advancement. In 1989 the concrete runway was put into operation at the newly built Bălți-Leadoveni International Airport (also managed by Moldaeroservice), thanks to which the passengers from the northern region of the Republic of Moldova gained the possibility of air travel to 14 cities of the former USSR with aircraft of the type Antonov An-24, Tupolev Tu-134, Let L-410 Turbolet until 1993.

With the dissolution of the Soviet Union, the airspace control and surveillance service became an independent service, delegated to the Bălți branch of the state enterprise "MOLDATSA".

The Combined Aviation Unit of Bălți, which became the Bălți Aviation Company, was reorganised and renamed "Moldaeroservice" in 1994. Thus, the company became a self-sufficient company as "Moldaeroservice" with its own balance sheet, having under its management: Bălți-Leadoveni International Airport (145 ha), Bălți-City Airport (136 ha), professional staff, buildings and premises necessary for the technological and production process, Antonov An-2 aircraft and Mil Mi-2 helicopters. In accordance with the air operator's permit № Md 001, issued by the Civil Aviation Authority of the Republic of Moldova, the company performs the following operations: air ambulance flights, observation flights, flights for search and rescue operations, advertising and leisure flights, flights for the benefit of the agricultural and forestry sector.

According to certificate MD.145.0025, Moldaeroservice is approved as a maintenance organisation for Antonov An-2 (ASH-62IR); Mil Mi-2 (GTD-350); C3; C5; C6; C7; C8; C9; C12; C13; C14; C18.9.

See also
Aviation in Moldova
Transport in Moldova

References

External links

Airlines of Moldova
Aviation in Bălți
Airlines established in 1966
Airlines established in 1994
Former Aeroflot divisions
Moldovan brands
1993 establishments in Moldova